Dhamsanwmah is a sub-district located in Nati' District, Al Bayda Governorate, Yemen.  Dhamsanwmah had a population of 757  according to the 2004 census.

References 

Sub-districts in Nati' District